Rukiya Bernard (born January 20, 1983) is a Canadian actress, producer and interior designer. She is known for her role as Doc in Syfy's Van Helsing, The Cabin in the Woods (2012), The Day the Earth Stood Still (2008) and Stuck (2007).

Early life 
Rukiya Bernard was born in Toronto, Ontario, to Nyakiringa Magugu, an African art store owner, and Gilbert Bernard, a car wash owner. From a very young age, Rukiya’s parents immersed her in sport and art programming. She took part in basketball and track while studying classical ballet, karate and piano. She was accepted into Ryerson University’s theatre program from which she graduated with honours.

Career 
Rukiya's first job was the supporting role of Sophie Newman in Ernest Dickerson’s award-winning Our America opposite Josh Charles, Irma P. Hall and Mykelti Williamson.
Rukiya has appeared in TV shows including SyFy's Van Helsing, The CW’s Supernatural, A&E’s The Returned, USA Network’s Fairly Legal, Hallmark’s The Gourmet Detective, NBC’s Eureka, Showtime’s The L Word, SyFy’s Sanctuary and SGU Stargate Universe, BBC America’s Intruders and Lifetime’s Witches Of The East End. She has also appeared in The Cabin In The Woods, Stuck and That Burning Feeling.

Interior design
Rukiya is an interior designer  and starred on HGTV’s reality TV show The Stagers for two seasons.

Personal life
Rukiya is married to P. J. Prinsloo, they have two children.

Filmography

Film

Television

References

External links 
 Rukiya Bernard at the Internet Movie Database

1983 births
Living people
Actresses from Toronto
Canadian television actresses
Canadian people of Nigerian descent
Black Canadian actresses
Canadian interior designers